Clement McFarlane (20 August 1900 – 2 March 1946) was an Australian cricketer. He played in three first-class matches for Queensland between 1924 and 1931.

See also
 List of Queensland first-class cricketers

References

External links
 

1900 births
1946 deaths
Australian cricketers
Queensland cricketers
Cricketers from Brisbane